{{safesubst:#invoke:RfD|||month = March
|day = 12
|year = 2023
|time = 03:27
|timestamp = 20230312032742

|content=
REDIRECT Three-dimensional space

}}